The Kara Dag ("Black Mount") is a volcanic rock formation which rises to a height of 577 meters between the Crimean coastal town of Koktebel and the Otuzka River valley. It has been the site of a  since the early 20th century. Some 2874 ha of coastline and 809 ha of coastal waters have been protected as the Karadag Nature Reserve since 1979. The littoral is rich in picturesque cliffs such as the Devil's Gate. The best views of the Black Mount are from Koktebel and Kurortnoye.

Gallery

See also
Crimean Mountains
Chatyr-Dag

References

External links

http://www.blacksea-crimea.com/Places/Kara-Dag.html
https://web.archive.org/web/20070711091427/http://www.tourism.crimea.ua/eng/dostoprim/parks/reserves/kardagvr/index.html
http://www.tour.crimea.com/ENGLISH/NAVIGATOR/ABOUT_CRIMEA/geography.shtml

Crimean Mountains
Volcanoes of Ukraine